Mitromorpha santosi is a species of sea snail, a marine gastropod mollusk in the family Mitromorphidae.

Description

Distribution
This deep-sea species occurs in the Atlantic Ocean off Brazil

References

 Lima S.F.B., Barros J.C.N. & Francisco J. de A. (2010) A new deep-sea species of Mitromorpha (Gastropoda: Conoidea: Conidae) off Brazil. Journal of the Marine Biological Association of the United Kingdom 90(3): 599–603

santosi
Gastropods described in 2010